The Runestones of Högby are runestones located in the village of Högby in Östergötland, Sweden, but the name Högby runestone (Swedish: Högbystenen) usually refers to the notable Ög 81. It is famous for its eloquent epitaph in fornyrðislag for all the five sons of a man. The runestone was found when the church was demolished in 1874. Fragments of some other runestones were found as well. The Rundata project dates them to the late 10th century.

The following presentations show the runic inscription transliterated into Latin script, followed by transcriptions into Old East Norse dialect of Old Norse, and it ends with a translation into English.

Ög 81

The Högby rune stone is in style Pr1. It commemorates Assur, one of the first Varangians who is known to have died in the service of the Byzantine Emperor, and he is estimated to have died c. 1010, or in the late 10th century. He was one of the sons of the "good man" Gulli, and the rune stone describes a situation that may have been common for Scandinavian families at this time: the stone was made on the orders of Assur's niece Þorgerðr in memory of her uncles who were all dead. 

Þorgerðr probably had the stone made as soon as she had learnt that Assur, the last one of her uncles, had died in Greece, and she probably did this to ensure her right of inheritance. On the reverse side of the stone, she inscribed how her other uncles had died in fornyrðislag.

Ásmundr probably died in the Battle of Fýrisvellir, in the 980s, and it was probably on the side of king Eric the Victorious. Assur had entered into the service of a more powerful liege and died for the Byzantine Emperor. Halfdan may have died either on Bornholm or in a holmgang, and where Kári died is not certain either. The most likely interpretation may be that he died on Od, the old name for the north-western cape of Zealand. Búi's location of death is not given, but it was probably in a way which was not as glorious as those of his brothers.

Transliteration of the runes into Latin characters
 Side A: 
 Side B: 
 Side C:

Transcription into Old Norse
 Side A: 
 Side B: 
 Side C:

Translation in English
 Side A: Þorgerðr(?) raised this stone in memory of Ôzurr, her mother's brother. He met his end in the east in Greece.
 Side B: The good man Gulli got five sons. The brave valiant man Ásmundr fell at Fœri; Ôzurr met his end in the east in Greece; Halfdan was killed at Holmr (Bornholm?); Kári was (killed) at Oddr(?);
 Side C: also dead (is) Búi. Þorkell carved the runes.

Ög 82

This runestone is in style RAK and it was made in memory of a man who owned or commanded the settlement.

Transliteration of the runes into Latin characters

Transcription into Old Norse

Translation in English
Þorkell carved(?) ... this in memory of Eyvindr, Tosti's son, who owned Haugbýr.

Ög 83

This runestone is tentatively categorized as style Pr1-Pr2 and it was made in memory of a son who died in the West.

Transliteration of the runes into Latin characters

Transcription into Old Norse

Translation in English
Þóra placed this stone in memory of Sveinn, her son, who died in the west in <ualu>.

See also
Joint Nordic database for runic inscriptions
List of runestones
De foro manligen fjärran efter guld … En historisk berättelse om utlandsfarare från Östergötland under vikingatiden, by Jan R. Asph.

Notes

Sources
Brate, Erik (1911). Östergötlands Runinskrifter.
Larsson, Mats G. (2002). Götarnas Riken : Upptäcktsfärder Till Sveriges Enande. Bokförlaget Atlantis AB 
Pritsak, Omeljan. (1981). ''The Origin of Rus'''. Cambridge, Mass.: Distributed by Harvard University Press for the Harvard Ukrainian Research Institute.

External source
Joint Nordic database for runic inscriptions

Runestones in memory of Viking warriors
Hogbe Runestone
Jomsvikings
Runestones in Östergötland
10th-century inscriptions